Joseph William Ashton  (9 October 1933 – 30 March 2020) was a British Labour Party politician who was known for his defence of the rights of Labour Members of Parliament (MPs) against the demands of the left wing of the party to subject them to mandatory reselection. He took his seat in a by-election, winning with a majority of just 1.72%; in his last election before retiring, he won it by a majority of 36.4%.

Early career

Ashton was born and brought up in Sheffield; he attended High Storrs Grammar School and Rotherham Technical College. Before he was elected as an MP, he was a Sheffield City Councillor beginning in 1962.

Parliament

Ashton was first elected as the Member of Parliament for Bassetlaw in a by-election in 1968, when he struggled to hold the seat (which had been Labour-held since 1929) at a time when the government of Harold Wilson was unpopular. The close result saw it become a marginal seat, won by Ashton with a majority of just 740 (1.72%). The previous MP, Captain Frederick Bellenger was said to have built a personal vote through his Labour canvassing, and in the local newspapers. Having been an MP since 1935, Bellenger died mid-term in May 1968 at the age of 73. He had just been awarded the Freedom of Worksop (a town in the constituency) two days before his death. Bellenger was among those deselected for any future election, however, for defying the party whip for his support of the purported continued government of the White Rhodesians and privatisation of steel (which the Labour government nationalised in 1967 as British Steel Corporation).

Pit closures were an important issue in a seat with a large mining sector vote. Ashton argued that the Labour government's approach, which included redundancy payments to miners over the age of 55, was better than the terms of the Conservatives when they were in power (1951-1964).

In 1974, when corruption allegations about MPs were circulating, Ashton gave an interview to the Labour Party newspaper Labour Weekly. Seeking to defend MPs in general, Ashton insisted that the number who were guilty of corruption "could be counted on the fingers of one hand". This statement backfired, as newspapers demanded that he name the guilty five MPs.

In 1977, Ashton published Grass Roots,<ref>Grass Roots (Quartet Books)</ref> a novel about a tough steelworker who becomes a rebellious Labour MP. The Times called it "the clearest guide to British party politics since Phineas Finn", while The Guardian said it was "packed with detail, as rich as a slice of fruit-cake, and as vivid and exciting as an eve-of-poll rally".  After his party went into opposition in 1979, he was among Labour backbencher columnists in the Daily Star.

Ashton saw himself as the shop steward for the Parliamentary Labour Party. When left-wing activists in the party demanded that sitting MPs submit themselves to their local party members for re-selection in each Parliament, he made a strong speech at the Labour Party Conference expressly pleading to save the jobs and livelihoods of Labour MPs. He pointed to infighting suiting the Tories, and the large number of Labour MPs who had died of stress-related illness, linking it to pressure from their local parties.

Later life
In March 1999, Northamptonshire's Chief Constable noted that Ashton had given misleading information to officers when in the same premises of the arrests of the perpetrators of immigration and sexual offences at a Northampton Thai massage parlour. This occurred during a police raid in November 1998. He was interviewed voluntarily and not accused of committing any offence. Ashton threatened to raise a data protection complaint. The police robustly denied that it had leaked Ashton's name; their statement said, "there were a great many other people with knowledge of this case - defendants, witnesses, legal representatives, other organisations and other individuals." A director of Sheffield Wednesday football club since 1990, he resigned as a director shortly after his presence at the parlour was established.

Following his retirement at the 2001 general election, he was succeeded by John Mann. In 2007, Ashton was appointed an OBE.

Ashton was interviewed in 2012 as part of The History of Parliament's oral history project. His memoir, Red Rose Blues'', was published in 2000.

Death
He died from dementia in March 2020, aged 86. He is survived by his daughter, Lucy.

References

External links 
 
 Interview BBC Radio Four, 17 July 2009.
 Joe Ashton interview at History of Parliament Online

1933 births
2020 deaths
British male novelists
Labour Party (UK) MPs for English constituencies
Technical, Administrative and Supervisory Section-sponsored MPs
UK MPs 1966–1970
UK MPs 1970–1974
UK MPs 1974
UK MPs 1974–1979
UK MPs 1979–1983
UK MPs 1983–1987
UK MPs 1987–1992
UK MPs 1992–1997
UK MPs 1997–2001
Officers of the Order of the British Empire
People educated at High Storrs Grammar School for Boys
20th-century British novelists
Royal Air Force airmen
20th-century British male writers
20th-century British writers
Politicians from Sheffield